James, Jim, or Jimmy Carr may refer to:

Government
James Carr (Massachusetts politician) (1777–1818), U.S. Congressman
James G. Carr (born 1940), American federal judge
Jim Carr (1951–2022), Canadian politician

Sports
James Carr (wrestler) (1955–2013), American Olympic wrestler
Jimmy Carr (American football) (1933–2012), American football player
Jimmy Carr (footballer) (1893–1980), Scottish footballer and bowls player

Others
J. L. Carr (1912–1994), known as Jim, English novelist
James Carr (singer) (1942–2001), American soul singer
Jimmy Carr (bookmaker) (1864–1942), South Australian bookmaker
James W. Carr (born 1948), American educator
Jim Carr (education) (born 1969), American technologist
Jimmy Carr (born 1972), English comedian